Verrucapelma retusa is a scale worm known from northern Australia, the Timor Sea and the Coral Sea from shallow water to depths of about 20 m.

Description
Verrucapelma retusa is a short-bodied worm with 35–36 segments and 15 pairs of elytra which bear a marginal fringe of papillae. The dorsum is covered with bands of brown-grey, which becomes fainter posteriorly. Lateral antennae are positioned beneath (ventral) on the prostomium. the notochaetae are about as thick as the neurochaetae. Neurochaetae with bidentate tips are also present.

References

Phyllodocida
Animals described in 1991